Jane Kingseed, better known as Jane King (born January 26, 1968), is an American journalist. King is the founder and CEO of LilaMax Media, which provides daily TV broadcast reports from the NASDAQ Marketsite. LilaMax Media launched January 21, 2014. King had previously been doing syndicated business and financial reports for Bloomberg News from the floor of the New York Stock Exchange. Those reports were discontinued on December 31, 2013. Before that, King covered local Business News for CNN's Newsource division, CNN Marketsource. Before joining CNN, King worked as a business reporter for WPVI-TV in Philadelphia and as an anchor and reporter at both WAND-TV in Decatur, Illinois.  King began as a reporter for WLFI-TV in Lafayette, Indiana. King launched LilaMax Media on January 13, 2014, in which she now does syndicated reports from the NASDAQ exchange.

Outside of journalism, King also has served as member and floor trader for the Chicago Board of Trade and as an adjunct professor of broadcast journalism at Purdue University.

King, who grew up in Greentown, Indiana and Kokomo, Indiana, lives in New York City, and is married, with one son and one daughter. She was awarded a Bachelor of Arts degree in Telecommunications from Purdue University in 1991.

References

External links
 Jane King at LilaMax Media
 Jane King on Bloomberg's Web site
 Description of Jane King on Bloomberg Affiliate's Page: KCRA
 Purdue Alumna Describes Time of "Complete Hopelessness"
 Krannert School of Management Executive Forum Fall 2007 bio
 CNN Newsource to Bolster Newsgathering Resources
 

Living people
1968 births
Purdue University alumni
American reporters and correspondents
People from Lafayette, Indiana
People from Kokomo, Indiana
Purdue University faculty
Bloomberg L.P. people
American women television journalists
American television news anchors
People from Greentown, Indiana
American women chief executives
American company founders
American women company founders
American women academics
21st-century American women